Bahnam Zaya Bulos (Arabic: بهنام زيا بولص; born 1944) was Minister of Transport in the cabinet appointed by the Interim Iraq Governing Council in September 2003.  A member of Iraq's Assyrian Christian minority, Bulos is originally from Baghdad, where he worked as a civil engineer.

References
 

Iraqi Assyrian politicians
Iraqi Christians
Government ministers of Iraq
1944 births
Living people
Iraqi Assyrian people
People from Baghdad